Alok Aradhe (born 13 April 1964) is an Indian Judge. Presently, he is a Judge of Karnataka High Court. He has also served as Acting Chief Justice of Karnataka High Court. He is former Judge of Jammu and Kashmir High Court and Madhya Pradesh High Court. He has also served as Acting Chief Justice of Jammu and Kashmir High Court.

Career
Aradhe was born in 1964 at Raipur, the then Madhya Pradesh. He passed B.Sc. and LL.B. and started practice in Madhya Pradesh High Court at Jabalpur from 1988. He worked on Civil, Constitutional, Arbitration and Company Matters. Aradhe was designated as Senior Advocate in April 2007. He revised the 5th and 6th editions of the book, Principles of Administrative Law by M. P. Jain and S. N. Jain with Late Hon'ble Chief Justice G. P. Singh. Aradhe was a visiting Faculty in Judicial Officers Training and Research Institute of Madhya Pradesh. On 29 December 2009 he was appointed  Additional Judge of the Madhya Pradesh High Court and was transferred to Jammu and Kashmir High Court on 16 September 2016. Justice Aradhe served as Chairman of Jammu and Kashmir State Judicial Academy and became the Executive Chairman of Jammu and Kashmir State Legal Services Authority. He took charge as Acting Chief Justice of the Jammu and Kashmir High court on 11 May 2018. He was again transferred to Karnataka High Court and took oath as Judge on 17 November 2018. He was appointed as Acting Chief Justice of Karnataka High Court on 3 July 2022 consequent upon the retirement of Justice Ritu Raj Awasthi, Chief Justice, Karnataka High Court.

References

1964 births
Living people
Indian judges
Judges of the Madhya Pradesh High Court
Judges of the Jammu and Kashmir High Court
Judges of the Karnataka High Court
21st-century Indian judges
People from Raipur, Chhattisgarh